Juan Sebastián Cabal and Robert Farah were the defending champions but decided not to participate.

Ariel Behar and Horacio Zeballos won the title, defeating Miguel Ángel López Jaén and Paolo Lorenzi in the final 6–4, 7–6(7–5).

Seeds

Draw

Draw

References
 Main Draw

Seguros Bolivar Open Bucaramanga - Doubles
2012 Doubles